Massimo Martino (born 18 September 1990) is a Luxembourgian football player who currently plays for UN Käerjéng 97.

Career
Martino began his career with Racing FC Union Luxembourg and signed in January 2009 for Jeunesse Esch, after just a half-year left Esch to sign for Wuppertaler SV on 20 July 2009.

International career
Martino made his debut for Luxembourg in a friendly match against Cape Verde on 27 May 2008. He made a second appearance against Belgium, Luxembourg drew both matches 1–1.

References

External links
 Massimo Martino player info at the official Racing FC Union website 

1990 births
Living people
Luxembourg international footballers
Luxembourgian footballers
Association football defenders
Wuppertaler SV players
Racing FC Union Luxembourg players
F91 Dudelange players
3. Liga players